Old Hemlock is a historic wildlife sanctuary on Brandonville Pike in Brandonville, West Virginia. Evans' writings had nationwide appeal, even though they were largely based in this region of the Allegheny Mountains. His estate is now owned by the Old Hemlock Foundation, established by his widow to preserve his legacy. The property is open for tours by appointment.

Old Hemlock was listed on the National Register of Historic Places in 2014.

References

External links
Old Hemlock Foundation web site

Houses on the National Register of Historic Places in West Virginia
Houses completed in 1789
Houses in Preston County, West Virginia
National Register of Historic Places in Preston County, West Virginia
Museums in Preston County, West Virginia
1789 establishments in Virginia
Historic house museums in West Virginia
Protected areas of Preston County, West Virginia